Roy is an Irish animated children's television series which was broadcast by TRTÉ in Ireland, CBBC in the United Kingdom and ABC3 in Australia. It aired from 1 July 2009 to 1 April 2015. 

The show centres on the title character Roy O'Brien, the 11-year-old animated son of a live-action family, as he settles into his new school in a suburb of Dublin. 

The series is filmed as a mockumentary and based on the short film called Badly Drawn Roy which was commissioned by the Irish Film Board, RTÉ and the Arts Council of Ireland through their frameworks scheme for new animation. 

The series was commissioned by CBBC and produced with funding from RTÉ and the Broadcasting Authority of Ireland. Both the series and the short film was produced by Jam Media. The series' protagonist, Roy's character animation is hand drawn in Flash with the compositing and effects produced in Adobe's After Effects. A second season was broadcast in early 2012. A third and fourth season were confirmed with the creation of 60 jobs in October 2012.In November 2012, the second season of Roy won the 2012 Children's BAFTA Drama Award

Filming began on a third and fourth season in January 2013. The third season began airing on 23 January 2014, and the fourth began airing 20 January 2015.

Main cast

Episodes

Series 1 (2009)

Series 2 (2012)

Series 3 (2014)

Series 4 (2015)

Spin-off series
Two spin-off series were announced and commissioned by BBC. Little Roy is about an animated 5-year-old boy on a journey of self-discovery through imaginative play — plus laugh-out-loud comedy, physical hijinks and emotional learning and it will air on both CBBC and CBeebies , making it the first time that a ROY series will air on the CBeebies channel.

The Roy Files is a spin-off that gives fans an exclusive insight into the life of Roy O’Brien, Ireland's only cartoon boy living in the real world. Roy turns his history homework into a scrapbook about himself that features exclusive new material and highlights from all four seasons of Roy.

References

External links
 

2010s Irish television series
Irish children's television shows
BBC children's television shows
Animated television shows based on films
Surreal comedy television series
Animated television series about children
Television series about families
Television series with live action and animation
Television shows set in the Republic of Ireland